Jeptha Vining Harris (May 27, 1839  – 1914) was an assistant surgeon for the Confederate States Army and Confederate States Navy during the American Civil War. After the Civil War, he was a customs collector, doctor and school superintendent at Key West, Florida.

Biography
Jeptha Vining Harris was born on May 27, 1839 in the Abbeville District of South Carolina. He was the sixth child of James Walton Harris and Martha Watkins Harris. James Walton Harris was the first child of Jeptha Vining Harris of Georgia and Sarah Hunt Harris.

Jeptha V. Harris grew up in North Carolina and Mississippi. Harris was the nephew of Jeptha Vining Harris (Mississippi general), a Mississippi militia (Confederate) brigadier general during the American Civil War (Civil War) and Mississippi State Senator. He was the grandson of Jeptha Vining Harris (Georgia general) and Sarah (Hunt) Harris. The elder Jeptha Vining Harris was a Georgia militia general during the War of 1812, prominent lawyer, planter and member of the Georgia House of Representatives.

Harris received his college and medical education at the University of Mississippi, graduating in 1859.

Jeptha V. Harris married Mary Perkins of Mississippi on March 5, 1861. They had the following children: Jeptha V. Harris, Jr., Louis A. Harris and Martha Watkins Harris. Both sons were lawyers.

Soon after he completed college and medical school, Harris served as an assistant surgeon in the Confederate States Army and Confederate States Navy during the American Civil War.

After the Civil War, Harris and his family moved to Key West, Florida, where he became customs collector and lived in the Customs House. He also resumed his medical practice.

Harris was interested in promoting and improving public education. Because of this interest, he became school superintendent at Key West. Harris School, which was built at Key West in 1909, was named for him.

Death 
Doctor Jeptha Vining Harris died November 16, 1916 and is buried in Key West Cemetery, Key West Florida.

Notes

References
 Allardice, Bruce S. Confederate Colonels: A Biographical Register. Columbia: University of Missouri Press, 2008. .
 Born, George Walter. Preserving Paradise: The Architectural Heritage And History of the Florida Keys. Charleston, SC: History Press, 2006. .
 Harris, Gideon Dowse. Harris Genealogy.  Columbus, Miss., Keith Printing Co., 1914. . Retrieved September 23, 2012.
 University of Mississippi. 'Historical and Current Catalogue of the Officers and Students of the University of Mississippi Forty-Second Session'. University of Mississippi: 1894. . Retrieved September 28, 2012.

1839 births
1914 deaths
University of Mississippi alumni
People of Mississippi in the American Civil War
People of Florida in the American Civil War
People from Abbeville County, South Carolina
People from Key West, Florida
Confederate States Army surgeons
Confederate States Navy surgeons